Akhtaruzzaman (1946 or 1947 – August 23, 2011) was a Bangladeshi film director. He was awarded the Bangladesh National Film Award for Best Director for his direction of the film Poka Makorer Ghor Bosoti (1996). The film won awards in eight different categories.

Career
Akhtaruzzaman directed three films: Ferari Basanta (1983), Princess Tina Khan (1984) and Poka Makorer Ghor Bosoti (1996). He was a teacher at the Film and Media Department in the Stamford University Bangladesh.

Akhtaruzzaman died on August 23, 2011. Before death he had been working on a film titled Suchona Rekhar Dike, sponsored by the Government of Bangladesh.

filmography
Ferari Basanta (1983)
Princess Tina Khan (1984)
Poka Makorer Ghor Bosoti (1996).

References

External links

2011 deaths
Bangladeshi film directors
Best Director National Film Award (Bangladesh) winners